Garm is a glacier of the King Frederick VI Coast in the Sermersooq municipality, southeastern Greenland. 

This glacier is named after Garm, the mythical dog that guards Hel's gate in Norse mythology.

Geography
Garm is located on the eastern side of the Greenland ice sheet.

In its last stretch the Garm glacier flows eastward and splits into two branches, one continuing eastwards into the head of the Sikuijuitsoq, a branch of the Sehested Fjord (Uummannap Kangertiva) and the other bending southwards with its terminus in the Ernineq Fjord at the northern end of the Timmiarmiut Fjord system.

See also
List of glaciers in Greenland

References

External links
Climate-related glacier fluctuations in southeast Greenland, Geological Survey of Denmark and Greenland, Department of Marine Geology and Glaciology, Copenhagen, Denmark
 Geoview - Garm
Glaciers of Greenland
Sermersooq

sv:Garm (glaciär i Grönland)